Vlado Stenzel (Serbo-Croatian: Vlado Štencl; born 23 May 1934) is a Croatian former handball goalkeeper and coach.

He's won the 1972 Summer Olympics gold medal with Yugoslavia and the 1978 World Championship with West Germany.

His wife's name is Diana and they have four children: Vanda, Vlatko, Helena and Daniel.

Honours
As player
Prvomajska Zagreb
Yugoslav First League
Winner (2): 1953, 1954
Championship of SR Croatia
Winner (2): 1954, 1955

As coach
Medveščak Zagreb
Yugoslav First League
Winner (2): 1963-64, 1965-66
Yugoslav Cup 
Winner (1): 1965
European Champions Cup
Finalist (1): 1964-65

Yugoslavia
1967 Mediterranean Games in Tunisia - 1st place
1970 World Championship in France -3rd place
1972 Olympic Games in Munich -1st place

Krivaja Zavidovići
Yugoslav First League
Third place (1): 1969-70

West Germany
1976 Olympic Games in Canada - 4th place
1978 World Championship in Denmark - 1st place
1982 World Championship in West Germany - 7th place

Bad Schwartau
Regional league - North 
Promotion (1): 1987-88

Milbertshofen
DHB-Pokal
Winner (1): 1990

Anhalt-Bernburg
Regional league - North 
Promotion (1): 2000-01

References

1934 births
Living people
RK Medveščak Zagreb players
RK Kvarner coaches
Croatian male handball players
Yugoslav expatriate sportspeople in Germany
Croatian expatriate sportspeople in Germany
Croatian handball coaches
Mediterranean Games medalists in handball
Mediterranean Games gold medalists for Yugoslavia
Competitors at the 1967 Mediterranean Games